Gurjar are an ethnic group in India, Afghanistan and Pakistan.  Notable people from the community include:

India

Historical figures 
 Prataprao Gujar, military leader of Shivaji Maharaj's Army.
 Nain Singh Nagar of Parichhatgarh was a notable Gurjar king of Meerut district in the Indian state of Uttar Pradesh in the 18th century.

Education and social reform
Masud Choudhary, is the founding Vice Chancellor of Baba Ghulam Shah Badshah University in Rajouri and Chief Patron of the Gurjar Desh Charitable Trust, Jammu.

Gojri language and literature
Javaid Rahi, is a Gurjar researcher of India. He has authored 12 books in Gujari/ Gojri Urdu and English and edited more than 300 books/ magazines highlighting the history, culture, and literature related to indigenous communities such as Gurjar and Bakarwals.
Sahir Ludhianvi, former Indian poet and film song lyricist

Armed forces
Kirori Singh Bainsla, a retired officer of the Indian Army and leader of a Gurjar reservation movement in Rajasthan
Kamal Ram, the second-youngest Indian to receive Victoria Cross, the highest military decoration in the British Empire
Kuldip Singh Chandpuri, retired officer of the Indian Army who was awarded the Maha Vir Chakra for his actions at the Battle of Longewala.

Indian independence movement
Ram Chandra Vikal, freedom fighter, Deputy Chief Minister of Uttar Pradesh.
 Kadam Singh, Raja of Parikshitgarh and Mawana, led Gurjar fight against the British during the Indian Rebellion of 1857.
 Dhan Singh Gurjar, Indian freedom fighter

Politics
 Rajesh Pilot, politician of the Indian National Congress party who represented the Dausa in Lok Sabha
 Pranav Singh, former MLA of Khanpur
 Malook Nagar, MP of Bijnor
Govind Singh Gurjar, (9 March 1932 – 6 April 2009) was a Gujjar from Rajasthan who served as Lt. Governor of Puducherry in India.
Mian Bashir Ahmed, (born November 1923) is a politician and a Caliph of Islamic Sufi order (Naqshbandi, Majadadi, Larvi). He is the first Gurjar from  Jammu and Kashmir who was awarded the Padma Bhushan (the third highest civilian award), by the government of India on 26 January 2008 for his contribution to the society.
Hukum Singh, former Member of Parliament from Kairana constituency of Uttar Pradesh
Yashpal Singh, former member of Parliament from Saharanpur constituency of Uttar Pradesh
Narayan Singh, former deputy Chief Minister of Uttar Pradesh
Virendra Singh, former member of Parliament from Uttar Pradesh
Sanjay Singh Chauhan, former member of Parliament from Bijnor constituency of Uttar Pradesh

Pakistan

Pakistan Independence Movement 

 Chaudhry Rahmat Ali, was a Pakistani nationalist who is credited with creating the name "Pakistan" for a separate Muslim homeland in South Asia and is generally known as the originator of the Pakistan Movement.

Government 

 Fazal Ilahi Chaudhry, was a Pakistani politician and lawyer who served as the Speaker of National Assembly and President of Pakistan.

Sports 

 Shoaib Akhtar, is a former cricketer and commentator. Nicknamed the "Rawalpindi Express", he was the first bowler to be recorded bowling at 100 miles per hour, a feat he achieved twice in his career.

Social and Welfare 

 Hafiz Saeed, Pakistani Islamist and founder of many religious and welfare organisations

Literature 
 Mian Muhammad Bakhsh, was a renowned Punjabi poet and Sufi scholar for the people of Punjab and Kashmir.

See also 
 List of Gurjar clans

References

Gurjar
Gurjars